Beirong Township is a township of Yuanling County, Hunan, China. , it administers the following fourteen villages:
Yangjiatan Village
Banzhuxi Village
Luoping Village
Tanmingtou Village
Jiaokou Village
Daqikou Village
Sanba Village
Zhangchaoya Village
Zhuhongxi Village
Dongshangping Village
Jietan Village
Dongshanxi Village
Zhuya Village
Tongxilang Village

See also
List of township-level divisions of Hunan

References

Townships of Huaihua
Yuanling County